Isaya Yunge  (born 23 March 1990) is a Tanzanian internet entrepreneur, speaker and first African J8 delegate to speak at the G8 2007 Summit. He was one of the two Tanzanians who received the Queen's Young Leader Award in 2018 as a recognition for his work to use a scholarship-matching mobile App (SomApp) that help more than 7000 young African people to progress in their education. He is the creator of SomApp a mobile application which enables African students to search for scholarships. 

In 2007 he was selected by UNICEF to be the UNICEF Africa Youth Ambassador and in this position at an age of 17's he spoke at the G8 2007 Summit as UNICEF Africa Youth Ambassador in Berlin Germany. In 2019 Yunge was named by Avance media to be among the Tanzania's 50 most influential young People.

Early life 
Yunge faced upbringing challenges due to unsuitability of his family caused by his parents living separately. That made him to grow as an outcast child who depended on several guardians who in different time supported him grow including his grandmother. Yunge spent his childhood time herding cows, goat and chasing birds on rice farms.

Career
Yunge's enthusiasm in technology industry emerged in 2014 and his visibility increased when he attended a talk with the American economist Jeremy Rifkin on the topic of the fourth industrial revolution, the sharing economy and collaborative commons. He founded SOMAPP Foundation (SomApp) (Soma a Swahili word for Study) a mobile application that helps students to search for scholarships for studies purposes. In 2018 Yunge was mentioned by Forbes to be among  40 African entrepreneurs who represented the continent at the Forbes 30 under 30 Summit in Boston Massachusetts and one of the upcoming Tanzanian billionaires where he spoke with CNBC Africa about the opportunities which the summit could bring to the coming entrepreneurs. Apart from SomApp, Yunge founded other products such as KAYA, a smart speaker using artificial intelligence to collect African related data. He also founded Somafit, smart watch that helps to measures blood pressure and heart beat rate using instantaneous health condition of the user. In his 17's he was among the HIV/AIDS educators who persuaded his fellow youth to abstain from the disease.

Leadership and awards
In 2018 he received the Queen's Young Leader Award through his scholarship mobile App (SomApp). 
One of the top three startups in the world at The Start-up Turkey Award.
First prize winner of The 2017 Mobile Money Hackathon in Dar es Salaam (GSMA)
Chairperson of the Junior Council of the United Republic of Tanzania.

External links
https://www.youtube.com/watch?v=7eidwvuLfZg&t=155s A YouTube video showing Isaya Yunge with George W. Bush among other international leaders.
https://www.youtube.com/watch?v=c0-xYpdeBp8 Daily news YouTube video portraying a Tanzanian young mentioned by Forbes as one of the upcoming billionaires.

References

Living people
Tanzanian businesspeople
Tanzanian chief executives
1990 births